Brownsville is a home rule-class city in Edmonson County, Kentucky, in the United States. It is the county seat and is a certified Kentucky Trail Town. The population was 836 at the time of the 2010 census, down from 921 at the 2000 census. It is included in the Bowling Green metropolitan area. It is just outside Mammoth Cave National Park.

Geography
The city limits border the western edge of Mammoth Cave National Park, with access to Houchin Ferry Campground.

State Routes 70 and 259 pass through the city together as Main Street. KY 70 leads east  to Cave City and west  to U.S. Route 231 at Aberdeen, while KY 259 leads southeast  to U.S. Route 31W and north  to Leitchfield.

The city is located on the Green River, a tributary of the Ohio River.

Demographics

As of the census of 2000, there were 921 people, 387 households, and 229 families residing in the city. The racial makeup of the city was 98.37% White, 0.11% African American, 0.43% Native American, 0.11% Asian, 0.11% from other races, and 0.87% from two or more races. Hispanic or Latino of any race were 0.76% of the population.

There were 387 households, out of which 26.4% had children under the age of 18 living with them, 40.6% were married couples living together, 16.8% had a female householder with no husband present, and 40.6% were non-families. 37.5% of all households were made up of individuals, and 15.8% had someone living alone who was 65 years of age or older. The average household size was 2.15 and the average family size was 2.81.

In the city, the population was spread out, with 20.3% under the age of 18, 8.6% from 18 to 24, 22.8% from 25 to 44, 24.4% from 45 to 64, and 23.9% who were 65 years of age or older. The median age was 43 years. For every 100 females, there were 72.5 males. For every 100 females age 18 and over, there were 71.1 males.

The median income for a household in the city was $15,370, and the median income for a family was $21,250. Males had a median income of $26,125 versus $14,583 for females. The per capita income for the city was $15,711. About 30.8% of families and 32.6% of the population were below the poverty line, including 45.2% of those under age 18 and 24.5% of those age 65 or over.

Plain community 

There is a Plain, horse and buggy community with about 40 to 50 people in Peace Valley, Brownsville. It is closely affiliated with Caneyville.

Education
Brownsville is served by the Edmonson County Schools. Schools in the district located in Brownsville are:
Edmonson County High School (Principal: Brian Alexander; Assistant Principal: Chad Johnston
Edmonson County Middle School (Principal:Brandon Prunty)
Edmonson County 5th/6th Center (Principal:Allan Talley.

Brownsville has a lending library, the Edmonson County Public Library.

Notable residents
Music promoter Denver D. Ferguson was born in Brownsville.

References

External links
 Brownsville at the U.S. Geographic Names Information System

Cities in Kentucky
Cities in Edmonson County, Kentucky
County seats in Kentucky
Bowling Green metropolitan area, Kentucky